Nathalie Rochefort is a Canadian politician, who represented the electoral district of Mercier in the National Assembly of Quebec from 2001 to 2003.

A member of the Quebec Liberal Party, she was elected in a by-election on April 9, 2001, following the resignation of Robert Perreault. She was defeated by Daniel Turp of the Parti Québécois in the 2003 election. She ran again in the 2007 election, but was not re-elected.

Rochefort is also a long-time member of the federal New Democratic Party (the Quebec Liberal Party is not affiliated with the Liberal Party of Canada). She endorsed Brian Topp for the leader of the party in 2012. Rochefort subsequently joined the federal Liberal Party ahead of the 2019 election, and is running as the party's candidate in Bécancour—Nicolet—Saurel.

Electoral record

Federal results

Provincial results

Notes and references

External links
 

1970 births
Living people
French Quebecers
Liberal Party of Canada candidates for the Canadian House of Commons
New Democratic Party candidates for the Canadian House of Commons
Politicians from Quebec City
Quebec candidates for Member of Parliament
Quebec Liberal Party MNAs
Women MNAs in Quebec
20th-century Canadian women politicians
21st-century Canadian women politicians